Agios Ilias ( meaning Saint Elias) is a village on the island of Lefkada, Greece that is part of the municipal unit of Apollonioi.

Population

External links
Agios Ilias on GTP Travel Pages (in English and Greek)

See also

List of settlements in the Lefkada regional unit

References

Populated places in Lefkada (regional unit)